Víctor Hugo Melgar (born February 28, 1988 in Tarija, Bolivia) is a Bolivian footballer currently playing for Universitario de Sucre.

External links 
 
 

1988 births
Living people
People from Tarija
Association football midfielders
Bolivian footballers
C.D. Jorge Wilstermann players
Club Blooming players
The Strongest players
Universitario de Sucre footballers